Robert Donald Cohen  (11 October 1933 – 17 October 2014) was a British physician, professor of medicine, and one of the leading experts on metabolic medicine.

Biography
After education at Plymouth College and then from 1947 to 1951 at Clifton College, Bristol, Cohen studied from 1951 to 1954 at Trinity College, Cambridge, where he graduated with first class honours in the natural science tripos. He then studied medicine from 1954 to 1958 at the London Hospital Medical College (LHMC). He graduated in 1958 MB BChir (Cantab.) and in 1966 M.D. (Cantab.). He qualified MRCP in 1960. In 1961 he married Barbara J. Boucher, who was also a medical student at LHMC. After junior appointments from 1958 to 1959 at the London Hospital, Robert Cohen was from 1959 to 1960 house physician at the Royal Postgraduate Medical School, where he worked at the endocrine and metabolic unit under Russell Fraser. At LHMC, Cohen was in 1960–1965 lecturer in medicine, in 1967–1969 senior lecturer, in 1969–1974 reader in medicine, in 1974–1982 professor of metabolic medicine, and in 1982–1995 professor of medicine and director of the academic medical unit. After LHMC merged in 1995, he was in 1995–1999 professor of medicine and director of the academic medical unit at Barts and The London School of Medicine and Dentistry. He retired as professor emeritus in 1999.

Cohen was elected FRCP in 1971. He was chair of the editorial board of Clinical Science from 1973 to 1975. He gave the Bradshaw Lecture in 1981. He was an active member of numerous medical committees. He was elected FMedSci in 1998. He chaired from 1994 to 2001 the Imperial Cancer Research Fund and played a central role in its merger in 2002 with The Cancer Research Campaign to create Cancer Research UK. He was appointed CBE in 1997.

Upon his death Cohen was survived by his widow, a daughter, a son, and five grandsons.

Lactic acidosis
In 1961 William E. Huckabee (1926–1986) described and defined the clinical problem of lactic acidosis. Cohen and H. Frank Woods introduced in 1976 what is now called the Cohen-Woods classification of the causes of lactic acidosis.

Selected publications

Articles
with W. A. H. Rushton: 
 (Cohen's MD thesis)
with J. M. Ledingham: 
with H. G. Lloyd-Thomas: 
with T. M. Savege, J. D. Ward, and B. R. Simpson: 
with D. E. Barnardo and R. A. Iles: 
with P. E. Belchetz, Margaret H. Lloyd, and R. G. S. Johns: 
with P E Belchetz, J L O'Riordan, and S Tomlinson: 
with Barry Barber and Maureen Scholes: 
with R A Iles, A H Rist, and P G Baron: 
with H. Frank Woods: 
with N. D. Martin and G. J. Snodgrass: 
with J S Beech, S R Williams, and R A Iles:

Books
with H. Frank Woods: 
as editor with B. Lewis, K. G. M. M. Alberti, A. M. Denman:

References

1933 births
2014 deaths
People educated at Plymouth College
People educated at Clifton College
Alumni of Trinity College, Cambridge
Alumni of the London Hospital Medical College
20th-century British medical doctors
21st-century British medical doctors
British hepatologists
Commanders of the Order of the British Empire
Fellows of the Royal College of Physicians
Fellows of the Academy of Medical Sciences (United Kingdom)